Copco Lake is an artificial lake on the Klamath River in Siskiyou County, California, near the Oregon border in the United States. The lake's waters are impounded by the Copco Number 1 Dam (National ID CA00323), which was completed in 1922. COPCO was an acronym referring to the California Oregon Power Company, which merged into Pacific Power and Light in 1961, and is now known as Pacificorp.

Copco Number 1 and Number 2 Dams are two of the four dams in the Klamath River Hydroelectric Project which have been proposed for removal.  As of February 2016, the states of Oregon and California, the dam owners, federal regulators and other parties reached an agreement to remove all four dams by the year 2020, pending approval by the Federal Energy Regulatory Commission (FERC). The plan was delayed in 2020 due to conditions placed on the project by FERC. As of February 25, 2022, the FERC released their final Environmental Impact Statement (EIS) on the dam's removal. The dam is expected to be removed sometime in 2023 or 2024. The social movement to Un-Dam the Klamath has been ongoing for 20 years.

Copco Number 1 Dam

PacifiCorp owns the dam.

Copco Number 2 Dam
Copco Number 2 Dam is a gated diversion dam located just below Dam No. 1. The diversion bypasses a canyon section of the Klamath River that historically consisted of some steep rapids. Because it has no effective storage capacity, Dam No. 2 depends entirely on the regulated flows released from Copco Lake.

Recreation
The lake is used for kayaking, fishing, swimming, windsurfing, power boating, and sailing, and the surrounding area has facilities for picnicking and hiking.

See also
 List of dams and reservoirs in California
 List of lakes in California

References

External links
 page at county website bad link
 COPCO LAKE Five Year Photos KLAMATH RIVER  KLAMATH DAMS

Reservoirs in Siskiyou County, California
Reservoirs in California
Reservoirs in Northern California